The second season of New Zealand Idol commenced on 3 July 2005. The judges were Paul Ellis, Jackie Clarke and Frankie Stevens.

Auditions
The auditions were held at the following locations:

 Telstraclear Pacific Events Centre, Manukau
 Riccarton Racecourse, Riccarton, Christchurch
 Trentham Racecourse, Trentham, Upper Hutt

Those who were successful would proceed to the "Top 60" theatre rounds held at the Telstraclear Pacific Events Centre in Auckland.

Theatre Week
The successful contestants who made it through to the "Top 60" rounds would spend a gruelling three days at the theatre.

 Day One: Contestants, in groups of six, were to sing in turn, a cappella, a song of their own choice. This year the judges deliberated immediately after each line sang, then delivered the verdict.
Eliminated: Carlie Howe, Francis Walker, Rachael, Kylie Adams, Amomai Pihema, Sera Devcich, Sally, Jamie, 

 Day Two: Trio performances would test the contestants' teamwork skills, with the guys performing Ben E. King's "Stand by Me", while the girls would perform Bill Withers' classic "Lean on Me."  At the end of this, the group was once more reduced by a further 12.
Eliminated: Herb, Tipene, Cre'-Ammon, Krystel, Ruth, Alison, Sarah, 

 Day Three: The remaining 36 contestants have one last opportunity to impress the judges. Once again they were to perform solo, (a cappella), in front of the judges.
Eliminated: Lance Ainofo, Tiresa, Nikki, Letitia, Peter Jackson, Lorna, Jamie Lamb, 

The decision of the final cut to the "Top 24" was delivered to three groups of twelve, with one group being sent home.

Semi-finals

Group 1

 Frank Andrews – "Nice and Slow" by Usher
 Kevin Malagamaali'i – "I Believe I Can Fly" by R. Kelly
 Christine Hutt – "Out of the Blue" by Delta Goodrem
 Keshia Paulse – "Hero" by Mariah Carey

 Marcel Bramao – "How Sweet It Is (To Be Loved by You)" by James Taylor
 Steven Broad – "Here Without You" by 3 Doors Down
 Katherine Creed – "Breakaway" by Kelly Clarkson
 Pip Kayser – "One Way or Another" by Blondie

Advancing to the Top 10: Frank Andrews, Keshia Paulse and Steven Broad
Wildcard Contenders: Kevin Malagamaali'i, Marcel Bramao

Group 2

 Saelyn Guyton – "I Feel the Earth Move" by Carole King
 Daniel Bell – "Virtual Insanity" by Jamiroquai
 Rick Bhatia – "This Love" by Maroon 5
 Lissel Stewart – "Chains" by Tina Arena

 Rosita Vai – "I Have Nothing" by Whitney Houston
 Shelley Paikea – "Saving All My Love for You" by Whitney Houston
 Mathew Morris – "When the War Is Over" by Cold Chisel
 Ashley Cooper – "Love Really Hurts Without You" by Billy Ocean

Advancing to the Top 10: Rosita Vai, Shelley Paikea and Ashley Cooper
Wildcard Contenders: Saelyn Guyton, Lissel Stewart

Group 3

 Clark To'o – "If There's Any Justice" by Lemar
 Rongo Brightwell – "Superstar" by The Carpenters
 Jesse O'Brien – "If You Could Only See" by Tonic
 Maselina Leimoa – "If I Ain't Got You" by Alicia Keys

 Teresa Bergman – "Uninvited" by Alanis Morissette
 Malia Matthews – "One Moment in Time" by Whitney Houston
 Nik Carlson – "I'm Your Baby Tonight" by Whitney Houston
 Makuini Taikato – "Reflection" by Christina Aguilera

Advancing to the Top 10: Rongo Brightwell, Jesse O'Brien and Nik Carlson
Wildcard Contenders: Clark To'o, Maselina Leimoa, Teresa Bergman, Malia Matthews

Wildcards

 Saelyn Guyton – "All Cried Out" by Allure
 Kevin Malagamaali'i – "Dance with My Father" by Luther Vandross
 Maselina Leimoa – "Brown Eyes" by Destiny's Child
 Teresa Bergman – "Burn" by Tina Arena

 Lissel Stewart – "Hit 'em Up Style (Oops!)" by Blu Cantrell
 Clark To'o – "Ordinary People by John Legend
 Marcel Bramao – "Your Body Is a Wonderland" by John Mayer
 Malia Matthews – "Stranded" by Lutricia McNeal

Advancing to the Top 10: Teresa Bergman

Weekly Song Themes

The Top 10 Finalists

Rosita Vai

Rosita Vai (born 4 June 1981 in Auckland) was the winner of the second series of "New Zealand Idol".

Audition: "I Have Nothing" by Whitney Houston
Theatre Week (Round 1):
Theatre Week (Round 3): "Work it Out" by Beyoncé Knowles
Top 24: "I Have Nothing" by Whitney Houston
Top 10: "Nobody's Supposed to Be Here" by Deborah Cox
Top 9: "I'm Coming Out" by Diana Ross
Top 8: "Always Be My Baby" by Mariah Carey
Top 7: "Golden" by Jill Scott
Top 6:  You're All I Need" by Aretha Franklin
Top 5: "If It Makes You Happy" by Sheryl Crow
Top 4: "Sweet Lovers" by The Holidaymakers, "Language" by Annie Crummer
Top 3: "I Can't Tell You Why" by The Eagles, "Dangerously in Love" by Beyoncé Knowles
Top 2: "How Come You Don't Call Me?" by Alicia Keys, "Golden" by Jill Scott, "All I Ask" (Winner's single)

Nik Carlson
Nik Carlson (born 8 November 1978 in Masterton), was runner-up to winner Rosita Vai.

Audition: "Let Me Love You" by Mario
Theatre Week (Round 1): "Hero" by Enrique Iglesias
Theatre Week (Round 3): "Me and Mrs. Jones" by Billy Paul
Top 24: "I'm Your Baby Tonight" by Whitney Houston
Top 10: "Don't You Worry 'bout a Thing" by Stevie Wonder Bottom 3
Top 9: "Sweet Love" by Anita Baker Bottom 2
Top 8: "Under the Bridge" by Red Hot Chili Peppers
Top 7: "I Believe in a Thing Called Love" by The Darkness / Lemar
Top 6: "Let's Stay Together" by Al Green
Top 5: "Beating Heart Baby" by Head Automatica
Top 4: "Watchin' U" by Ardijah, "It's Too Late" by Evermore Bottom 2
Top 3: "Someone to Love" by Jon B. & Babyface, "Is This Love" by Bob Marley
Top 2: "Never Too Much" by Luther Vandross, "I Believe in a Thing Called Love" by The Darkness / Lemar, "All I Ask" (Winner's single)

Steven Broad

Steve Broad (born 29 January 1986, from Invercargill), came third.

Audition: "Tomorrow" from the film, "Annie"
Theatre Week (Round 1): "Better Be Home Soon" by Crowded House
Theatre Week (Round 3): "I Can See Clearly Now" by Johnny Nash
Top 24: "Here Without You" by 3 Doors Down
Top 10: "Spin" by Lifehouse
Top 9:  "With or Without You" by U2
Top 8: "(Everything I Do) I Do It for You" by Bryan Adams Bottom 3
Top 7: "Smooth" by Santana & Rob Thomas Bottom 3
Top 6: "Signed, Sealed, Delivered (I'm Yours)" by Stevie Wonder Bottom 3
Top 5: "Higher" by Creed
Top 4: "Walls" by Shihad, "Stand Up" by The Feelers
Top 3: "Your Song" by Elton John, "Burn for You" by John Farnham

Jesse O'Brien
Jesse O'Brien, (born 25 September 1977, in Dunedin, now residing in Hamilton), was placed fourth.

Audition: "Be Yourself" by Audioslave
Theatre Week (Round 1): "One Last Breath" by Creed
Theatre Week (Round 3): "Nothing Can Wait" by Opshop
Top 24: "If You Could Only See" by Tonic
Top 10: "Be Yourself" by Audioslave
Top 9: "Where the Streets Have No Name" by U2
Top 8: "Incomplete" by The Backstreet Boys
Top 7: "I Don't Want to Be" by Gavin DeGraw
Top 6: "Hard to Handle" by Otis Redding Bottom 2
Top 5: "Best of You" by The Foo Fighters Bottom 2
Top 4: "Why Does Love Do This To Me?" by The Exponents, "No Ordinary Thing" by Opshop Eliminated

Teresa Bergman
Teresa Bergman (born 14 October 1986, in Lower Hutt), finished in fifth place. She originally missed out on a place in the Final 10 but was brought back for the Wildcard Special and received the last position into the finals.

Audition: "Secret Song" by Alanis Morissette
Theatre Week (Round 1): "Only When I Sleep" by The Corrs
Theatre Week (Round 3):
Top 24: "Uninvited" by Alanis Morissette
Wildcard: "Burn" by Tina Arena
Top 10: "Mascara" by Killing Heidi
Top 9: "Roam" by The B-52's Bottom 3
Top 8: "Foolish Games" by Jewel
Top 7: "Going Under" by Evanescence
Top 6: "Walk On By" by Dionne Warwick
Top 5: "Zombie" by The Cranberries Eliminated

Rongo Brightwell
Rongo Brightwell (16 September 1987 in Mohaka, Hawke's Bay), was placed sixth.

Audition: "Superstar" by The Carpenters
Theatre Week (Round 1): "Dancing in the Street" by Martha and the Vandellas
Theatre Week (Round 3): "I Heard It Through the Grapevine" by Marvin Gaye
Top 24: "Superstar" by The Carpenters
Top 10: "Hidden Agenda" by Craig David
Top 9:  "Get Outta My Dreams, Get into My Car" by Billy Ocean
Top 8: "Never Gonna Give You Up" by Rick Astley
Top 7: "Colour Me Life" by Katchafire Bottom 2
Top 6: "Ain't Too Proud to Beg" by The Temptations Eliminated

Frank Andrews
Frank Andrews (born 22 June 1985, in Rotorua), finished in seventh place.

Audition: "O" by Omarion
Theatre Week (Round 1): "Let Me Love You" by Mario
Theatre Week (Round 3): "A Whole New World" by Peabo Bryson and Regina Belle
Top 24: "Nice and Slow" by Usher
Top 10: "How Could You" by Mario
Top 9: "I Want to Wake Up with You" by Boris Gardiner
Top 8: "Bump, Bump, Bump" by B2K & P Diddy Bottom 2
Top 7: "That Girl" by Marques Houston Eliminated

Ashley Cooper

Ashley Cooper (born 23 February 1988 in Cambridge), placed eighth.

Audition: "When You Say Nothing at All" by Ronan Keating
Theatre Week (Round 1): "Midnight Train to Georgia" by Gladys Knight
Theatre Week (Round 3): "When I See You Smile" by Bic Runga
Top 24: "Love Really Hurts Without You" by Billy Ocean
Top 10: "Everywhere" by Michelle Branch Bottom 2
Top 9: "Listen to Your Heart" by Roxette
Top 8: "Don't Speak" by No Doubt Eliminated

Keshia Paulse
Keshia Paulse (born 14 December 1984 in Auckland), finished ninth.

Audition: "Natural Woman" by Aretha Franklin
Theatre Week (Round 1):
Theatre Week (Round 3): "Chain of Fools" by Aretha Franklin
Top 24: "Hero" by Mariah Carey
Top 10: "Only Believe" by Yolanda Adams
Top 9:  "Let's Hear It for the Boy" by Deniece Williams Eliminated

Shelley Paikea
Shelley Paikea (born 25 May 1981 in Pukekohe), was placed tenth.

Audition:
Theatre Week (Round 1): "I Wanna Dance with Somebody" by Whitney Houston
Theatre Week (Round 3):
Top 24: "Saving All My Love for You" by Whitney Houston
Top 10: "Lovin U" by Alicia Keys Eliminated

The Top 10 Group Performances
The Top 10: "Dedicated to the One I Love" by The Shirelles
The Top 9: "Wake Me Up Before You Go-Go" by Wham!
The Top 8: "Unchain My Heart" by Joe Cocker
The Top 7: "The Reason" by Hoobastank
The Top 6: "You Can't Hurry Love" by The Supremes
The Top 5: "Life Is a Highway" by Tom Cochrane
The Top 4: "Glorafilia" by Zed
The Top 3: "If I Let You Go" by Westlife
The Top 2: "Upside Down" by Diana Ross

The Grand Final
The final was held on 17 October, with the following performances:

 Lissel Stewart, Marcel Bramao, Saelyn Guyton: "Crazy" by Seal
 Shelley Paikea: "Lovin U" by Alicia Keys
 Keshia Paulse: "Only Believe" by Yolanda Adams
 Ashley Cooper: "Everywhere" by Michelle Branch
 Frank Andrews: "How Could You" by Mario
 Rongo Brightwell: "Get Outta My Dreams, Get into My Car" by Billy Ocean
 Teresa Bergman: "Going Under" by Evanescence
 Jesse O'Brien: "Where the Streets Have No Name" by U2
 Steve Broad: "Spin" by Lifehouse
 The Top 10: "Shout" by Tears for Fears
 Rosita Vai: "Dangerously in Love" by Beyoncé Knowles
 Nik Carlson: "Let's Stay Together" by Al Green
 Frank, Jesse, Rongo & Steve: "Tainted Love" by Soft Cell
 Keshia, Ashley, Shelley & Teresa: "Walking on Sunshine" by Katrina and the Waves
 Frankie Stevens & Jackie Clarke: "Put a Little Love in Your Heart" by Jackie DeShannon
 Ben Lummis & Sela Mahe: "Never Say I Love You" by Ben Lummis
 Rosita Vai: "All I Ask"  (winner's single)

Elimination chart

Commercial Releases

References

External links
 Official New Zealand Idol website

New Zealand Idol
2005 New Zealand television seasons